The Women's 500 metre Time Trial C1-3 track cycling event at the 2016 Summer Paralympics took place on September 11. eleven riders competed.

Results

References

Cycling at the 2016 Summer Paralympics